Wendy Lesser (born 1952) is an American critic, writer, and editor based in Berkeley, California. She is the founding editor of the arts journal The Threepenny Review, and the author of a novel and several works of nonfiction, including most recently a biography of the architect Louis Kahn, for which she won the 2017 Marfield Prize.

Biography 
Lesser was born in 1952 in Santa Monica, California and moved in 1955 to Palo Alto, California, where she was raised. She is the daughter of Murray Lesser, an engineer and writer, and Millicent Dillon, a writer. She earned a B.A. at Harvard University in 1973; a B.Phil. at King's College, Cambridge, in 1975; and a Ph.D. at the University of California, Berkeley, in 1982.

She is the author of several books, including a novel, The Pagoda in the Garden (Other Press, 2005), and the nonfiction book Why I Read (Farrar, Straus & Giroux, 2014).

She is a member of the American Academy of Arts and Sciences, and has received fellowships from the Guggenheim Foundation, National Endowment for the Humanities, the Dedalus Foundation, and the New York Public Library's Cullman Center for Scholars and Writers, among other places.

Works
The Life Below the Ground: A Study of the Subterranean in Literature and History (1987)
His Other Half: Men Looking at Women Through Art Harvard University Press, 1991. , 
Pictures at an Execution  	Cambridge, Mass. : Harvard University Press, 1994. , 
A Director Calls Berkeley : University of California Press, 1997. , 
The Amateur: An Independent Life of Letters New York : Vintage Books, 1999. , 
 Портрет балерины (Tamara Toumanova)
Nothing Remains the Same: Rereading and Remembering Boston [u.a.] : Houghton Mifflin, 2002. , 
The Pagoda in the Garden New York : Handsel Books, 2005. , 
Room for Doubt  New York : Pantheon Books, 2007. , 
Music for Silenced Voices: Shostakovich and His Fifteen Quartets New Haven, Conn. : Yale University Press, 2011.  , 
Why I Read: The Serious Pleasure of Books New York : Picador/Farrar, Staus and Giroux, 2014. , 
You Say to Brick: The Life of Louis Kahn  	New York : Farrar, Straus and Giroux, 2017. , 
Scandinavian Noir: In Pursuit of a Mystery. New York : Farrar, Straus and Giroux, 2020,

References

External links

Other Press
The Threepenny Review 
Freeze framed: Wendy Lesser's essays break emotional ice, review of Room for Doubt by Emily Weinstein at The Village Voice
Random House: Wendy Lesser
Films42 feature: Wendy Lesser

1952 births
Living people
Radcliffe College alumni
Alumni of King's College, Cambridge
University of California, Berkeley alumni
20th-century American novelists
21st-century American novelists
American women novelists
20th-century American women writers
21st-century American women writers
People from Palo Alto, California
Novelists from California